Pleurotus citrinopileatus, the golden oyster mushroom (tamogitake in Japanese), is an edible gilled fungus.  Native to eastern Russia, northern China, and Japan, the golden oyster mushroom is very closely related to P. cornucopiae of Europe, with some authors considering them to be at the rank of subspecies.  In far eastern Russia, P. citrinopileatus, they are called iI'mak, is one of the most popular wild edible mushrooms.

Description
The fruiting bodies of P. citrinopileatus grow in clusters of bright yellow to golden brown caps with a velvety, dry surface texture. The flesh is thin and white, with a mild taste and without a strong smell. The gills are white, closely spaced, and run down the stem. The spores of the golden oyster mushroom are cylindrical or elliptical in shape, smooth, hyaline, amyloid, and measure 6-9 by 2–3.5 micrometres.

Ecology
The golden oyster mushroom, like other species of oyster mushroom, is a wood-decay fungus.  In the wild, P. citrinopileatus most commonly decays hardwoods such as elm.  Spores are spread by the beetle Callipogon relictus. The first official sightings of naturalized golden oysters in the United States appeared around 2012, perhaps a decade after the cultivation of the species began in North America, and they have been found growing on oak, elm, beech, and other hardwoods. Naturalized golden oysters have been found in many states including: Delaware, Illinois, Iowa, Maryland, Massachusetts, Michigan, Minnesota, New York, Ohio, Pennsylvania, and Wisconsin. Their vigorous range expansion is comparable to invasive species. Wild samples and two of the commercial isolates examined showed very high genetic similarity, alluding to potential source strains of wild populations.

Uses
Golden oyster mushrooms are cultivated commercially, usually on a medium of grain, straw, or sawdust.  Pleurotus species are some of the most commonly cultivated mushrooms, particularly in China, due to their ease of cultivation and their ability to convert 100 g of organic refuse into 50-70 g of fresh mushrooms.

Chemistry 
Pleurotus citrinopileatus mushrooms are a source of antioxidants.  Extracts from P. citrinopileatus have been studied for their antihyperglycemic properties, decreasing blood sugar levels in diabetic rats.  They have also been studied as a source of lipid-lowering drugs; P. ostreatus, a related oyster mushroom, has been found to contain the cholesterol-lowering drug lovastatin.

In one study, among 11 other commonly cultivated or foraged mushroom species, Pleurotus citrinopileatus contained the second highest amount of the antioxidant and amino acid ergothioneine at 3.94mg per gram of dry weight, and fourth highest in glutathione at 1.39mg per gram of dry weight. Both compounds had their highest concentrations in the pileus tissue. It had the highest amount of ergothioneine among the other saprotrophs within the group.

See also
List of Pleurotus species
Ergothioneine

References

External links
 
 
 Pleurotus citrinopileatus at Mushroom Observer
 "Pleurotus citrinopileatus" at iNaturalist
"Grow Pleurotus citrinopileatus" at Shroom Stop

Pleurotaceae
Fungi described in 1943
Fungi of Asia
Fungi of China
Fungi in cultivation
Edible fungi
Carnivorous fungi